The Battle of Otumba was fought between the Aztec and allied forces led by the Cihuacoatl Matlatzincátzin and those of Hernán Cortés made up of the Spanish conquerors and Tlaxcalan allies, which took place on July 7, 1520, in Temalcatitlán, a plain near Otumba during the development of the Conquest of the Aztec Empire. The result of the battle was a victory for the Spanish, which allowed Cortés to reorganize his army, having suffered casualties a few days before in the episode known as La Noche Triste. A year later, by reinforcing his army with new men and supplies, and creating alliances with the indigenous peoples who had been subjugated by the Aztec, Cortés managed to besiege and conquer Tenochtitlan.

Background 
Around the end of March 1519, Hernán Cortés landed with a Spanish conquistador force at Potonchán on the coast of modern-day Mexico. Cortés had been commissioned by Governor Diego Velázquez de Cuéllar of Spanish-controlled Cuba to lead an expedition in the area, which was dominated by the Aztec Empire.  At the last moment, though, Velázquez revoked Cortés's commission, but he decided to launch his expedition regardless.

Through a combination of raw force and political maneuvering, Cortés was able to secure the allegiance of the Totonacs and the Tlaxcaltec (subjugated enemies of the Aztec empire) among other groups during his advance on the Empire's main settlement, Tenochtitlan.  In November, a Spanish force entered the city and was greeted by its ruler, Moctezuma II.

Initially, the conquistadors were treated well by the Aztecs whilst they stayed in the city, until Velázquez, angered at Cortés' disobedience, sent an armed force at the command of Pánfilo Narváez against Cortés to bring him to justice and claim the lands and riches he had conquered. Cortés was forced to leave a small garrison of men in Tenochtitlan at the command of one of his lieutenants, Pedro de Alvarado,  whilst he took his small force to meet Narváez in battle. After securing a quick and brilliant victory, Cortés joined Narvaez' forces to his own, and marched back to Tenochtitlán, as he had heard word that the city was up in arms against the remaining Spaniards. Upon arriving, Alvarado told Cortés' he had been convinced that the Aztecs planned to attack the Spaniards and thus struck preemptively during an Aztec ritual ceremony, which caused an outrage in Tenochtitlán. The Aztecs named a new emperor to replace Moctezuma, whom they regarded now as weak and easily influenced by the Spaniards. Cortés attempted to negotiate a peace, and as a last resort, urged Moctezuma to speak with his people to achieve a truce, but the angry Aztecs struck down Moctezuma in a hail of rocks. This was the state of affairs  by the end of June 1520. Desperate to escape the city, and further convinced by an omen one of the Spaniards claimed to have received, the Spaniards resolved to leave the city that night in an event called La Noche Triste (The Night of Sorrows). During this attempt at salvation, however, Cortés' forces and entourage (consisting of civilian women and men of both Spanish and Indian extraction) were severely cut down. Of the Spanish force of approximately 1300, only less than 500 men at arms escaped with their lives, along with a few hundred Tlaxcalans and civilians. Cortés then started a retreat to Tlaxcala, during which his force was harassed by Aztec skirmishers, and the Aztec leadership resolved to eliminate them as they withdrew.

Battle 

After being beleaguered on the causeway leading out of the city, the surviving Spanish forces arrived at the plain of Otumba, where they encountered a vast Aztec army. Despite their opponents' exhaustion and hunger, the Aztecs failed to capitalize on their numerical superiority by not attacking right away. 

According to conquistador Bernal Diaz del Castillo's account of the events, it was the Castilian cavalry that was decisive for victory in the perilous battle. The Aztecs regarded the Spaniards as already defeated, and were looking to gain glory from capturing live Spaniards to sacrifice to their gods. The Castilian cavalry spearheaded the attack, breaking through the ranks and decimating the Aztec lines, preparing them for the assault of the Castilian rodeleros and Tlaxcalan infantry. Though this approach was successful, the sheer numbers of the Aztecs still managed to overwhelm the Castilians.

The Aztecs, meanwhile, had not encountered Castilians in battle, despite their long exposure to them during the Spaniards' time in Tenochtitlan. They were unfamiliar with the use of troops mounted on horses as shock troops and were taken aback when mounted Spanish soldiers continually charged at them. For all of their numbers, they were unprepared to endure cavalry charges.

Spanish success was also thanks to Cortés' strategy; he had instructed his troops to strike primarily at the captains and leaders of their opponent. Cortés himself recognized the Aztec leader Matlatzincatl for his rich armor, headdress, and flag. He correctly assumed that defeating their leader and capturing their flag would result in the defeat of the Aztecs. He communicated his idea to his captains and led a charge for Matlatzincatl, followed by Gonzalo de Sandoval, Pedro de Alvarado, Cristóbal de Olid, Juan de Salamanca, and Alonso Dávila. Cortés attacked the Aztec leader with his lance, and the rest of his captains broke the ranks of the warriors around him. Matlatzincatl was slain by Juan de Salamanca, who retrieved the Aztec battle-standard and delivered it to Cortés. With their leader slain, the Aztec force diminished gradually, and the Tlaxcalan and Castilian warriors routed them.

Aftermath
With this victory, the Spanish conquistadors were able to reach the safe haven of Tlaxcala, regroup, and gather their strength for an eventual counter-attack deep into the Aztec territory, which would result in the Fall of Tenochtitlan and the foundation of New Spain.

See also
 Spanish conquest of the Aztec Empire
 Cristobal de Olid
 Gonzalo de Sandoval
 Dona Marina

Footnotes

Sources 
 
 
 

Otumba
Battles involving the Aztec Empire
Battles involving Spain
Battles involving Tlaxcala
Conflicts in 1520
Spanish conquests in the Americas
History of the Aztecs
1520 in Mexico
1520 in North America